Mashimba Mashauri Ndaki is a Tanzanian CCM politician and was the Minister of Livestock and Fisheries between 2020 and 2023. He has served as Member of Parliament representing Maswa West in Simiyu Region since October 2015.

References

Living people
1962 births
Chama Cha Mapinduzi MPs
Chama Cha Mapinduzi politicians
Government ministers of Tanzania
Tanzanian MPs 2020–2025
University of Dar es Salaam alumni
Open University of Tanzania alumni
Southern New Hampshire University alumni